Angami Zapu Phizo (16 May 1904 – 30 April 1990) was a Naga nationalist leader with British nationality. Under his influence, the Naga National Council asserted the right to self-determination which took the shape of armed resistance after the Indian state imposed the Armed Forces Special Powers Act in 1958. Naga secessionist groups regard him as the "Father of the Naga Nation".

Early life
Angami Zapu Phizo was born on 16 May 1913 in Khonoma to an Angami Naga family. He belonged to the Merhüma clan of Khonoma. He had collaborated with the Japanese army in Burma. His face was heavily twisted following a childhood paralytic attack.

Political life
As the British were preparing for their withdrawal from India, Phizo separately met the indigenous Assamese, Garos, Khasis, Lushais, Abors, Mishmis and Meiteis leaders in an attempt to convince them to form independent countries of their own, instead of joining the proposed Union of India. However, his efforts failed. On 14 August 1947, one day before India gained its independence, Phizo declared the independence of Naga region.

Phizo's influence in the Naga National Council (NNC) increased in late 1940s, after the NNC secretary Imti Aliba Ao retired from politics for an appointment in the Indian Frontier Administrative Services. 
Phizo was incarcerated in Calcutta's Presidency Jail in 1948 on charges of stirring trouble in the Indo-Burma borderland. After his release from the jail, he became the fourth president and the main ideologue of the National Naga Council. Phizo became the NNC Chairman in October–November 1949 after defeating Vizar Angami of Zakhama village by a margin of one vote. Under his leadership, the NNC inclined towards seeking secession from India. Phizo urged the Naga people to boycott the Indian elections. He met the Indian Prime Minister Jawaharlal Nehru in December 1951 near Tezpur in Assam, in March 1952 at Delhi, and in July 1952 at Dibrugarh. He also met with Jaipal Singh in 1952. He was arrested in Burma for illegal entry.

In September 1954, Phizo formed the "People's Sovereign Republic of Free Nagaland", with the support of Chang chiefs of Tuensang. He also reorganized the NNC setup, as the chances of a peaceful settlement declined.

In 1955, the Angami leaders T. Sakhrie (who had served as the secretary of NNC since its inception) and J. B. Jasokie broke off with Phizo at a meeting in the Khonoma village. Phizo got Sakhrie murdered in January 1956. On 22 March 1956 he formed the "Naga Central Government", which was later renamed to "Federal Government of Nagaland" (FGN) in 1959. The new organization had a military wing.

Phizo escaped to East Pakistan (present-day Bangladesh) in December 1956, from where he went to London. He continued supporting the secessionist movement in Nagaland, until his death in exile, in London in 1990. He had 11 children. When he escaped from the erstwhile Naga Hills to East Pakistan, he did not have an Indian passport. After acquiring a British passport while in London, the Indian embassy refused to issue him a visa to visit India. 
Khodao Yanthan said later, "Mr. Phizo was a perfect Naga leader. I don't believe there will be any Naga leader like Mr. Phizo."

See also
 Naga nationalism

References

Further reading

External links
 Plebiscite speech of Phizo
 Picture of Phizo at Kamat.com

1913 births
1990 deaths
Indian Baptists
People from Kohima district
Indian exiles
Indian independence activists from Nagaland
20th-century Baptists
Naga nationalism